The Yazoo City expedition was an expedition of Union forces from the Vicksburg garrison under General John McArthur against Confederate forces in central Mississippi under General Wirt Adams.

History
McArthur's expedition was in conjunction with a second Union raid under Samuel D. Sturgis in northern Mississippi.  McArthur’s primary objective was to divert Confederate forces away from Sturgis’ front.  Initially, Confederate department commander Stephen D. Lee showed little concern over these two raids concluding it was merely an attempt to divert attention.  However, McArthur’s expedition steadily drove Adams’ Confederates from their positions, skirmishing at Benton, Luce’s Plantation and Vaughn’s Station along the Mississippi Central Railroad. Upon seeing the concentration of Confederate forces to his front, McArthur concluded his objective had been met, along with destruction of the Mississippi Central Railroad.  McArthur ordered Alfred W. Ellet and the Mississippi Marine Brigade to remain in Yazoo City while he returned to Vicksburg with the remainder of his force.  Despite meeting his objectives, McArthur’s expedition was unable to prevent the defeat of Sturgis at the Battle of Brices Cross Roads. McArthur was still content with the showing of strength and proof Union forces could move into the interior of Mississippi when desired.

Opposing forces

Union
Post of Vicksburg: Brigadier General John McArthur
1st Brigade (2nd Brigade, 4th Division, Dist. of Vicksburg): Col Benjamin Dornblaser
46th Illinois Infantry
76th Illinois Infantry
2nd Brigade (2nd Brigade, 1st Division, XVII Corps): Col James Henry Coates
11th Illinois Infantry
72nd Illinois Infantry
124th Illinois Infantry
Artillery: Captain Bolton, Chief of Artillery
Battery L, 2nd Illinois Light Artillery
7th Ohio Battery
Cavalry: Col Embury D. Osband
1st Kansas Mounted Infantry
5th Illinois Cavalry, detachment
11th Illinois Cavalry, detachment
3rd U.S. Colored Cavalry

Confederate
Department of Alabama, Mississippi & East Louisiana: Lieutenant General Stephen D. Lee
Wirt's Cavalry Brigade: Brigadier General W. Wirt Adams

Battles
Benton (May 7–9, 1864)
Luce's Plantation (May 13, 1864)
Vaughn Station (May 15, 1864)

References

Military operations of the American Civil War in Mississippi
Conflicts in 1864
1864 in Mississippi
 Yazoo
May 1864 events